Mosolesa Tsie (born 20 January 1980) is a Lesotho boxer. He competed in the men's welterweight event at the 2000 Summer Olympics.

References

1980 births
Living people
African Games bronze medalists for Lesotho
African Games medalists in boxing
Competitors at the 1999 All-Africa Games
Lesotho male boxers
Olympic boxers of Lesotho
Boxers at the 2000 Summer Olympics
People from Maseru
Welterweight boxers